Unionville is an unincorporated community and census-designated place (CDP) in Bedford County, Tennessee, United States. Its population was 1,368 as of the 2010 census. Unionville has a post office with ZIP code 37180.

Demographics

History
Unionville was platted in 1827, and named for the fact two rival settlements merged with the new name. A post office has been in operation at Unionville since 1837.

Education
Unionville contains three Bedford County public schools, the Community Elementary School (kindergarten to grade 5), the Community Middle School (grades 6 to 8), and Community High School (grades 9 to 12).

Notable person
The community was the birthplace of Tennessee governor Jim Nance McCord, born in 1879.

References 

Census-designated places in Bedford County, Tennessee
Unincorporated communities in Tennessee
Census-designated places in Tennessee
Unincorporated communities in Bedford County, Tennessee